Mabenaro is a Tacanan language spoken, or at least once spoken, along the Madre de Dios River of Peru. It is known only from a list of 54 words which are not very well transcribed.

References

Tacanan languages